Wydrze  is a village in the administrative district of Gmina Rakszawa, within Łańcut County, Subcarpathian Voivodeship, in south-eastern Poland.
Strona miejscowosci: www.wydrze.pl.

References

Wydrze